Early On (1964–1966) is a compilation album by David Bowie, released in 1991. It is notable as the first and only attempt to compile a comprehensive collection of all of Bowie's pre-Deram material and encompasses multiple labels including Vocallion, Parlophone, and Pye. Tracks three and four are alternate versions to the official singles, while "Do Anything You Say" is also a different mix to the normal single. There are also five unreleased songs included that came from Shel Talmy's collection. Talmy produced Bowie's second and third single.  A cassette version was released, however this omitted "Liza Jane", "Louie, Louie Go Home", and "Good Morning Girl".

Background
Bowie began his recording career as Davie Jones, a variation of his birth name, David Robert Jones. His first single (tracks 1–2) was recorded with The King Bees. The B-side was also released by Paul Revere and the Raiders as "Louie, Go Home" in 1964.

Bowie switched to The Manish Boys for his second single (tracks 3–4). In February 1965, he switched again to The Lower Third (tracks 5–13). For his third single, he also changed his name to Davy Jones. To avoid confusion with The Monkees band member, he adopted the name David Bowie before his fourth single.

A financial dispute ended his relationship with The Lower Third on 28 January 1966. For his fifth single (tracks 14–15), he teamed up with The Buzz, who were uncredited on the release. Dissatisfied with the band's performance on tour, they were replaced with session musicians on Bowie's sixth single (tracks 16–17).

Track listing

Record Labels: Vocalion Pop (tracks 1–2); Parlophone (tracks 3–4, 8–9); Pye Records (tracks 12–17).

References

External links

David Bowie compilation albums
1991 compilation albums
Rhino Records compilation albums